Green Sergeant's Covered Bridge is a wooden covered bridge  over the Wickecheoke Creek near the border between the Hunterdon Plateau and Amwell Valley located in Delaware Township, Hunterdon County, New Jersey.  As the last historic covered bridge in the state of New Jersey, it was listed on the National Register of Historic Places on November 19, 1974 for its significance in engineering and transportation (the Scarborough Bridge in Cherry Hill is the only other covered bridge in New Jersey). It was added as a contributing property to the Covered Bridge Historic District in 1999.

History
In 1805, Charles Sergeant bought the property in the area. After his death in 1833, the property was inherited by his son, Richard Green Sergeant, the namesake of the bridge. The bridge was constructed in 1872, designed by Charles Ogden Holcombe of Lambertville. After being damaged in 1960, it was dismantled and replaced with a modern bridge.  In 1961, due to public outcry, the bridge was rebuilt from the original materials.

The bridge has been damaged numerous times over the course of its history by vehicles striking the bridge structure, most recently in 2013 when a truck damaged the support beams of the bridge.

Gallery

See also
National Register of Historic Places listings in Hunterdon County, New Jersey
List of bridges on the National Register of Historic Places in New Jersey

References

External links

 

Delaware Township, Hunterdon County, New Jersey
Road bridges on the National Register of Historic Places in New Jersey
Wooden bridges in New Jersey
Bridges completed in 1872
Bridges in Hunterdon County, New Jersey
National Register of Historic Places in Hunterdon County, New Jersey
New Jersey Register of Historic Places
Covered bridges on the National Register of Historic Places in New Jersey
Historic American Buildings Survey in New Jersey